Ghostly International is an American independent record label founded in 1999 by Samuel Valenti IV and currently headquartered in Brooklyn, New York City. Chief artists include Matthew Dear, Dabrye (a.k.a. Tadd Mullinix), Com Truise, Tycho, Gold Panda, School of Seven Bells, Mux Mool, and Shigeto.

History
Ghostly International was founded in Ann Arbor, Michigan by Sam Valenti IV in 1999. He grew up in suburban Detroit, where, having become a fan of underground music culture, he would sneak into hip-hop clubs by carrying records for his Detroit DJ hero Houseshoes. Valenti later became a DJ himself, taking the name DJ SpaceGhost; this theme is echoed by the name and logo of Ghostly International.

Valenti met Matthew Dear at a house party that Valenti attended during his first week at the University of Michigan in Ann Arbor. Their shared affection for electronic music, particularly the sound of Detroit techno, led to the label's (and Dear’s) first 12 inch single, "Hands Up For Detroit." Following this, Ghostly enjoyed early success with albums by Mullinix as well as Disco Nouveau, a compilation including artists such as ADULT., Solvent, Legowelt, Daniel Wang and DMX Krew, inspired by the Italo disco movement of the 1970s and 1980s.

The label has since widened its focus to include groups such as Skeletons & The Girl-Faced Boys and Mobius Band, whose rock-based sound meshes with the label's eccentric leanings. Also known for forward-thinking package design by the likes of Will Calcutt and Deanne Cheuk, as well as the Boy, Cat, and Bird logos of Michael Segal, Ghostly International aims to be a complete aesthetic experience.

Ghostly International followed up Disco Nouveau with two more successful compilation albums featuring its artists: Idol Tryouts and Idol Tryouts 2.

Ghostly International also runs a companion label, Spectral Sound, dedicated to more dancefloor-oriented music coming from some of the same artists on Ghostly (such as James T. Cotton, another moniker of Tadd Mullinix, aka Dabrye).

Ghostly International and Adult Swim released a compilation album known as Ghostly Swim, available on Adult Swim's website for free. It was released with a bonus track on January 27, 2009 as a limited edition CD. A sequel to Ghostly Swim, Ghostly Swim 2, was released digitally on December 23, 2014, and on CD on April 28, 2015.

The label has also been involved in the soundtracks for video games. In 2014, Ghostly released a compilation album of new and previously recorded work by Ghostly artists to act as the soundtrack to the video game Hohokum. A year later, the first soundtrack to critically acclaimed videogame Minecraft by German musician C418 was released by Ghostly as a vinyl LP on August 21, 2015, four years after its original digital release by C418. In 2018 a limited edition version of the Super Nt home video game console was made by Analogue Inc. and Ghostly International.

Spectral Sound 
Spectral Sound is a record label that was originally an offshoot of Ghostly International, but has since gained similar notoriety thanks to successful records by Matthew Dear and other techno producers.  The label began in 2000 to fulfill the more dancefloor-oriented interests of founder Samuel Valenti IV, and early singles included artists like Kenneth Graham, Osborne and James T. Cotton (aka Dabrye).

Spectral’s first full-length was Leave Luck to Heaven by Matthew Dear in 2003, which proved to be a seminal fusion of pop and minimal techno.  Primarily propelled by 12" singles, Spectral has broadened its initial American focus to include international producers like Hakan Lidbo and Mike Shannon, and has been likened to contemporaries Kompakt and Perlon.

List of artists

Adult.
Aeroc
Beacon
Choir of Young Believers
Christopher Willits
Ciel
Com Truise
C418
Dabrye
Dauwd
Fort Romeau
Geotic
Gold Panda
Heathered Pearls
HTRK
Jacaszek
Kate Simko
 Khotin
Kiln
Lord RAJA
Lusine
Mary Lattimore

Matrixxman
Matthew Dear
Michna
Moderna
Mux Mool
Nautiluss
Pale Sketcher
Phantogram
Psymun
Recondite
Sam Valenti IV
Shigeto
The Sight Below
Solvent
Tadd Mullinix
Tobacco
Tropic of Cancer
Ultraísta
Willits + Sakamoto (Christopher Willits & Ryuichi Sakamoto)
Xeno & Oaklander

Formerly signed

10:32
Ben Benjamin
Black Marble
Cepia
The Chap
Charles Manier
Clark Warner
Daniel Wang
Deastro
Dykehouse
Grand Valley State New Music Ensemble
JDSY
Jeffery Sfire

Kill Memory Crash
Loscil
Midwest Product
PostPrior
Mike Servito
Mobius Band
North Valley Subconscious Orchestra
School of Seven Bells
Skeletons & The Kings of All Cities
Syntaks
Twine
Tycho

References

External links
 Official site
 Metro Times article
 Ghostly Apparitions - An Exploration of Michael Cina's Album Artwork for Ghostly International
 Ghostly International moves to Tech Brewery, inks new deals

American independent record labels
Techno record labels
Music of Ann Arbor, Michigan
Record labels based in Michigan
Record labels established in 1999
Companies based in Ann Arbor, Michigan
1999 establishments in Michigan